Kathryn Petralia is an American entrepreneur, and the co-founder and COO of Kabbage.

In November 2017, she was assessed by Forbes as being the 98th most powerful woman in the world. In December 2017, she was listed in a TechCrunch feature on 42 women succeeding in tech that year.

Early life and education
Kathryn Petralia was born on 17 August 1970. At age nine, she was given a TRS-80 computer by her parents, and developed an interest in technology. She was an English major and earned a B.A. in English literature from Furman University.

Career

Startups
Starting in the early 1990s, she began working at companies focused on "technology, payments and e-commerce." She became involved in "alternative lending" in the late 1990s. She also launched a west coast commerce startup in the mid-1990s. Early on she was involved with US Web. She was director of strategy for Visionary Systems. Early on, she was a vice president and co-founder of WorthKnowing.com, which was later sold to CompuCredit and TransUnion. Afterwards, she spent seven years in corporate development with CompuCredit, As a corporate development executive with CompuCredit Corporation (now Atlanticus), she was in charge of "entering new markets" and developing products.

She was afterwards the vice president of strategy for Revolution Money in St. Petersburg, Florida.

Kabbage
In 2008, she co-founded Kabbage along with Marc Gorlin and Rob Frohwein. The business opened for business in May 2011. In 2015, the Kabbage platform was extended to large banks such as Santander. She continues to serve as Kabbage's head of operations and has also served as its chief operating officer.

Personal life
She and her husband have two children, and live in Atlanta, Georgia.

References

External links
Petralia at Kabbage

Living people
Furman University alumni
Year of birth missing (living people)